The following is a list of awards and nominations received by Sudeepa, Indian actor and director who is most well-known for his work in the Kannada language film industry. Notably, Sudeep has won four Filmfare Awards South and is the only actor to have won three consecutive Filmfare Awards to date.

Filmfare Awards South

The Filmfare Awards South is part of the Filmfare Awards, which are awarded to people working in the South Indian film industry, including the Tamil, Telugu, Malayalam and Kannada film industries. Sudeep is the only actor to date to have won three consecutive FilmFare Awards.

Karnataka State Film Awards
The Karnataka State Film Awards are the most important awards given for Kannada cinema. They are given annually by the Government of Karnataka. The winners are selected by a jury headed by a chairman.

South Indian International Movie Awards (SIIMA)
The South Indian International Movie Awards (SIIMA) honours artists in the [South Indian film industry.

Nandi Awards
The Nandi Awards are the most important awards given for Telugu cinema. They are given annually by the Government of Andhra Pradesh. The winners are selected by a jury headed by a chairman.

Zee Cine Awards Tamil
The Zee Cine Awards Tamil are presented by Zee Tamil, a Tamil television channel to honour artists in Tamil cinema as well as Indian cinema.

Zee Cine Awards
The Zee Cine Awards are presented by Zee Entertainment Enterprises, to honour artists in Hindi cinema.

TSR-TV9 National Film Awards
The TSR – TV9 National Film Awards are the most important awards given for the work in feature films in Indian Cinema.

Suvarna Film Awards
The Suvarna Film Awards are presented by Asianet Suvarna, a Kannada television channel to honour artists in Kannada cinema. The awards were established in 2008.

Toronto After Dark Film Festival
The Toronto After Dark Film Festival (TADFF) is a showcase of horror, sci-fi, action and cult cinema held annually in Toronto, Canada at the Bloor Cinema. The festival premieres a diverse selection of feature-length and short-films from around the world including new works from Asia, Europe and North America.

Madrid International Film Festival
The Madrid International Film Festival held annually in Madrid, Spain.

Film Fan's Association Awards

CineMAA Awards
The CineMAA Awards are presented by Maa TV, a Telugu television channel to honour artists in Telugu cinema. The awards were established in 2004.

Vijay Awards
The Vijay Awards are presented by STAR Vijay, a Tamil television channel to honour artists in Tamil cinema. The awards were established in 2006.

Edison Awards (India)
The Edison Awards, India are presented by MyTamilMovie.com and sponsored by Jet Airways, Videocon, etc. to honour artists in Tamil cinema. The awards were established in 2009.

Times Film Awards
The Times Film Awards are presented by Times Of India, a newspaper group to honour artists in Indian Cinema including regional film industry.

ViKa (Vijaya Karnataka) Web Cinema Awards
The ViKa (Vijaya Karnataka) Web Cinema Awards are presented by Vijaya Karnataka.

IBNLive Movie Awards
The IBNLive Movie Awards are presented by CW IBNLive.

Zee Dashakada Sambhrama
The Zee Dashakada Sambhrama awards presented by Zee Kannada, a Kannada television channel to honour social personalities in Karnataka.

TV9 Sandalwood Star Awards
The Sandalwood Star Awards are presented by TV9 Kannada, a Kannada television channel to honour artists in Kannada cinema.

Zee Kannada Innovative Film Awards
The Innovative Film Awards were presented by Zee Kannada, a Kannada television channel to honour artists in Kannada cinema.

Hello Gandhinagara Awards
The Hello Gandhinagara Awards were presented by Hello Gandhinagara, a Kannada magazine to honour artists in Kannada cinema.

Asianet Kaveri Film Awards
The Asianet Kaveri Film Awards were presented by Kaveri Channel, a Kannada television channel to honour artists in Kannada cinema.

Videocon-Suprabhata Awards
The Videocon Suprabhata Awards were presented by Suprabhata, a Kannada television channel to honour artists in Kannada cinema.

Bengaluru Press Club Awards

Karnataka Wellfare Association Awards

Others
This list includes awards, votes, etc. where Sudeepa appears by websites, organizations or magazines.

See also
 Sudeep filmography

References

External links
 
 
 

Sudeepa